The second inauguration of Woodrow Wilson as president of the United States was held privately on Sunday, March 4, 1917, at the President's Room inside the United States Capitol in Washington, D.C. and publicly on Monday, March 5, 1917, at the East Portico of the Capitol. This was the 33rd inauguration and marked the commencement of the second and final four-year term of both Woodrow Wilson as president and Thomas R. Marshall as vice president. Chief Justice Edward D. White administered the presidential oath of office to Wilson.

Crowds of men in Washington for the inauguration assaulted women who were picketing the White House and demanding that women get the right to vote. Press coverage of the violence and the women's suffrage movement overshadowed that of the inauguration itself.

See also
Presidency of Woodrow Wilson
First inauguration of Woodrow Wilson
1916 United States presidential election

References

External links

Text of Wilson's Second Inaugural Address

United States presidential inaugurations
1917 in Washington, D.C.
1917 in American politics
Inauguration 2
March 1917 events